Glen Dyberry Cemetery is located in Honesdale, Pennsylvania.

Description
The cemetery, alongside the Dyberry Creek, was granted organization in 1854 and features meandering pathways, hillside plots, and many ornamented burial markers. The cemetery includes a mausoleum built in 1891 and other notable features, making it a local landmark frequented by grave site visitors, walkers, and bicyclists alike.

History
The Honesdale Cemetery Company was incorporated by prominent Delaware & Hudson Canal Co. officials from an act dated January 26, 1854. Mr. and Mrs. John Torrey sold 18 acres near Dyberry Creek for $2,000 in 1859 for the cemetery and 49 lots were sold during the first sale. Roads named Central Avenue, Hillside, Willow, and Winding Way were laid out within the cemetery. It opened on November 25, 1859.

Members of prominent families—Appley, Dimmick, Greene, Lord, Searle, Torrey, and Young—are buried at Glen Dyberry. About 4,000 people were buried in the cemetery as of 1947. Soldiers who fought in the War of 1812 and the American Civil War are buried there.

Notable people
 Jennie Augusta Brownscombe, 19th-century artist and illustrator
 Susan E. Dickinson, Civil War era journalist
 William Harrison Dimmick, member of the U.S. House of Representatives from Pennsylvania
 Cornelius Comegys Jadwin, member of the U.S. House of Representatives from Pennsylvania
 David McKelvey Peterson, World War I flying ace
 Art Wall Jr., professional golfer
 Richard B. Smith, Songwriter of Winter Wonderland

References

Further reading

External links
 

Honesdale, Pennsylvania
Cemeteries in Pennsylvania
1859 establishments in Pennsylvania